"Smokin' Me Out" was the second single released from Warren G's second album, Take a Look Over Your Shoulder. The song featured Ron Isley on the chorus and sampled The Isley Brothers' song "Coolin' Me Out", for which all of the brothers were given writing credits. "Smokin' Me Out" was Warren G's fifth top-40 single, peaking at 35 on the Billboard Hot 100, the song was also a hit in the UK, where it peaked at 14.

Single track listing

A-Side
"Smokin' Me Out" (Radio)
"Smokin' Me Out" (LP Version)
"Smokin' Me Out" (Instrumental)

B-Side
"We Brings Heat" (Radio)
"We Brings Heat" (Instrumental)
"Smokin' Me Out" (Acappella)

Charts

Weekly charts

Year-end charts

References

1997 singles
Music videos directed by Paul Hunter (director)
Warren G songs
Def Jam Recordings singles
1997 songs
Songs written by Warren G